The Scout and Guide movement in Kuwait is served by two organisations 
 Kuwait Girl Guides Association, member of the World Association of Girl Guides and Girl Scouts
 Kuwait Boy Scouts Association, member of the World Organization of the Scout Movement

International Scouting units in Kuwait
In addition, there are American Boy Scouts in a couple of regions, Safat and Al-Zour, linked to the Direct Service branch of the Boy Scouts of America, which supports units around the world, as well as Girl Scouts of the USA and British Scouts.

See also